Dryopteris aemula, the hay-scented buckler-fern or hay-scented fern, is a species of perennial leptosporangiate fern.

Description

Dryopteris aemula grows as a crown of fronds arising from a short ascending rhizome.

The rachis is dark purple-brown with red-brown lanceolate scales. Scattered small sessile glands grow on the underside or both surfaces of the fronds. Pinnae are slightly concave giving the frond a characteristic crisped appearance. The plant is hay-scented.

Sori or spore-producing organs occur in a row down each side of the midrib. The indusium of the sorus is irregularly toothed and edged with sessile glands.

The plant does not reproduce vegetatively and relies upon spores to generate new individuals.

Taxonomy

Distribution
Dryopteris aemula is confined to the atlantic coastal areas of western Europe and Macaronesia. D. aemula is highly oceanic in its distribution occurring mostly in the Köppen climate type Cfb (oceanic climates). Even within Great Britain, it is restricted to western districts and has just a few outlying eastern localities such as The Weald.

D. aemula reaches the northern limit of its distribution in Britain.

20% of the world population of D. aemula is in the United Kingdom.

Ecology and conservation

A fern of shady, often rocky, woodlands, usually on acidic soils.

In Britain, it is generally found in NVC woodland community W17.

References

External links
National Biodiversity Network's Gateway : grid map for Dryopteris aemula''
Global Biodiversity Information Facility (GBIF) Data Portal: Dryopteris aemula
Ecological Flora of the British Isles : Dryopteris aemula

Further reading

Clapham A. R., Tutin,  T. G., Moore D. M. (1990). Flora of the British Isles. 3rd Ed. Cambridge University Press.  Cambridge.
Page, C.N. (1997). The ferns of Britain and Ireland. 2nd Ed. Cambridge University Press. Cambridge.
Wardlaw, A.C and Leonard, A (2005) (editors). New Atlas of Ferns & Allied Plants of Britain & Ireland. British Pteridological Society Special Publications no.8.

aemula
Flora of Europe